Valeri Tikhonenko (born 19 August 1964) is a retired Soviet and Russian professional basketball player and coach. During his playing career, he played at the small forward and power forward positions, with power forward being his main position. He represented both the Soviet Union and Russia in national team competitions. With the Soviet Union, he won a gold medal at the 1988 Summer Olympics.

Professional career
Tikhonenko was selected by the Atlanta Hawks, in the 7th round of the 1986 NBA Draft, with the 157th overall draft pick. During his pro club career, Tikhonenko won three Russian Championships with CSKA Moscow (1998, 1999, 2000).

National team career
With the senior Soviet Union national team, Tikhonenko won a gold medal at the 1984 Friendship Games (the alternate tournament to the 1984 Summer Olympics), a gold medal at the 1985 EuroBasket, a silver medal at the 1986 FIBA World Cup, a silver medal at the 1987 EuroBasket, a gold medal at the 1988 Summer Olympics, a bronze medal at the 1989 EuroBasket, and a silver medal at the 1990 FIBA World Cup. He also played at the 1992 Summer Olympics, as a member of the Unified Team).

As a member of Russia's national team, he played at the 1998 FIBA World Cup, where he won a silver medal, and at the 1999 EuroBasket.

Executive career
Tikhonenko became the general manager of the Kazakh League club Astana, in 2011.

Personal life
Tikhonenko was a lieutenant colonel in the Russian Army.

Orders won
USSR Medal "For Distinguished Labour"
USSR Order of Friendship of Peoples
USSR Order of the Badge of Honor
Honored Master of Sports of the USSR (1988)
Russian Order of Friendship

References

External links 
FIBA Profile
FIBA Europe Profile
Sports-Reference.com Profile
Basketball-Reference.com Profile
Spanish League Profile 
Spanish League Archive Profile 
EuroLeague Coach Profile
Тихонéнко 

1964 births
Living people
1986 FIBA World Championship players
1990 FIBA World Championship players
1998 FIBA World Championship players
Atlanta Hawks draft picks
Baloncesto Málaga players
Basketball executives
Basketball players at the 1988 Summer Olympics
Basketball players at the 1992 Summer Olympics
BC Arsenal Tula players
BC Dynamo Moscow coaches
BC Samara coaches
BC Samara players
CB Peñas Huesca players
CB Valladolid players
Liga ACB players
Medalists at the 1988 Summer Olympics
Olympic basketball players of the Soviet Union
Olympic basketball players of the Unified Team
Olympic gold medalists for the Soviet Union
Olympic medalists in basketball
PBC CSKA Moscow coaches
PBC CSKA Moscow players
People from Angren, Uzbekistan
Power forwards (basketball)
Russian basketball coaches
Russian expatriate basketball people in Spain
Russian men's basketball players
Small forwards
Soviet men's basketball players
Soviet expatriate sportspeople in Spain